Preedi River is river in Estonia in Järva and Lääne-Viru County. The river is 82.6 km long and basin size is 291.5 km2. It runs from Varangu Allikajärv into Põltsamaa River.

Several species of fish can be found in the river, including trout and grayling.

References

Rivers of Estonia
Järva County
Lääne-Viru County